The 1993 Chicago Cubs season was the 122nd season of the Chicago Cubs franchise, the 118th in the National League and the 78th at Wrigley Field. The Cubs finished fourth in the National League East with a record of 84–78.

Offseason
December 2, 1992: Steve Lake was signed as a free agent with the Chicago Cubs.
December 8, 1992: Dan Plesac was signed as a free agent with the Chicago Cubs.
December 9, 1992: Randy Myers signed as a free agent with the Chicago Cubs.
December 18, 1992: Willie Wilson was signed as a free agent with the Chicago Cubs. 
February 8, 1993: Steve Lyons was signed as a free agent with the Chicago Cubs.
March 28, 1993: Steve Lyons was released by the Chicago Cubs.

Regular season

Season standings

Record vs. opponents

Notable Transactions
June 1, 1993: Heathcliff Slocumb was traded by the Chicago Cubs to the Cleveland Indians for Jose Hernandez.
June 3, 1993: Brooks Kieschnick was drafted by the Chicago Cubs in the 1st round (10th pick) of the 1993 amateur draft. Player signed July 22, 1993.
June 3, 1993: Steve Rain was drafted by the Chicago Cubs in the 11th round of the 1993 amateur draft. Player signed July 5, 1993.
July 30, 1993: Karl Rhodes was traded as part of a 3-team trade by the Kansas City Royals to the Chicago Cubs. The New York Yankees sent John Habyan to the Kansas City Royals. The Chicago Cubs sent Paul Assenmacher to the New York Yankees.
August 19, 1993: Glenallen Hill was traded by the Cleveland Indians to the Chicago Cubs for Candy Maldonado.

Roster

Game log 

|-
|- style="background:#fbb;"
| 1 || April 5 || Braves || 0–1 || Maddux (1–0) || Morgan (0–1) || Stanton (1) || 38,218 || 0–1 || L1
|- style="background:#bfb;"
| 2 || April 6 || Braves || 1–0 || Guzmán (1–0) || Smoltz (0–1) || – || 37,402 || 1–1 || W1
|- style="background:#fbb;"
| 3 || April 7 || Braves || 4–5  || Howell (1–0) || Scanlan (0–1) || – || 20,775 || 1–2 || L1
|- style="background:#bfb;"
| 4 || April 9 || @ Phillies || 11–7 || McElroy (1–0) || Rivera (0–1) || Myers (1) || 60,985 || 2–2 || W1
|- style="background:#fbb;"
| 5 || April 10 || @ Phillies || 4–5 || Mulholland (2–0) || Morgan (0–2) || Williams (3) || 21,081 || 2–3 || L1
|- style="background:#fbb;"
| 6 || April 11 || @ Phillies || 0–3 || Schilling (2–0) || Guzmán (1–1) || – || 21,955 || 2–4 || L2
|- style="background:#bfb;"
| 7 || April 12 || @ Braves || 5–1 || Hibbard (1–0) || Avery (0–1) || – || 39,749 || 3–4 || W1
|- style="background:#fbb;"
| 8 || April 13 || @ Braves || 2–3 || Glavine (2–0) || Castillo (0–1) || Stanton (4) || 49,116 || 3–5 || L1
|- style="background:#bfb;"
| 9 || April 14 || @ Braves || 6–0 || Harkey (1–0) || Smith (1–1) || – || 45,758 || 4–5 || W1
|- style="background:#bfb;"
| 10 || April 16 || Phillies || 3–1 || Morgan (1–2) || Mulholland (2–1) || Myers (2) || 16,255 || 5–5 || W1
|- style="background:#bfb;"
| 11 || April 17 || Phillies || 6–3 || Guzmán (2–1) || Schilling (2–1) || Myers (3) || 32,680 || 6–5 || W2
|- style="background:#fbb;"
| 12 || April 18 || Phillies || 10–11  || Williams (1–0) || Scanlan (0–2) || West (1) || 28,758 || 6–6 || L1
|-style="background:#bbb;"
|—|| April 19 || Astros || colspan=7 | Postponed (rain); Makeup: July 10
|- style="background:#bfb;"
| 13 || April 20 || Astros
|- style="background:#fbb;"
| 14 || April 21 || Astros
|- style="background:#fbb;"
| 20 || April 28 || @ Astros
|- style="background:#fbb;"
| 21 || April 29 || @ Astros

|-

|-

|-
|- style="background:#bfb;"
| 83 || July 9 || Astros
|- style="background:#fbb;"
| 84 || July 10 || Astros
|- style="background:#fbb;"
| 85 || July 10 || Astros
|- style="background:#fbb;"
| 86 || July 11 || Astros
|- style="background:#fbb;"
| 94 || July 22 || @ Astros
|- style="background:#fbb;"
| 95 || July 23 || @ Astros
|- style="background:#bfb;"
| 96 || July 24 || @ Astros
|- style="background:#bfb;"
| 97 || July 25 || @ Astros

|-
|- style="background:#bfb;"
| 123 || August 20 || Braves || 6–3 || Morgan (8–11) || Stanton (4–5) || Myers (36) || 38,797 || 61–61–1 || W1
|- style="background:#fbb;"
| 124 || August 21 || Braves || 3–6 || Freeman (2–0) || Plesac (0–1) || McMichael (9) || 39,507 || 61–62–1 || L1
|- style="background:#fbb;"
| 125 || August 22 || Braves || 3–4 || Smoltz (13–9) || Guzmán (11–8) || McMichael (10) || 38,321 || 61–63–1 || L2
|- style="background:#bfb;"
| 129 || August 27 || @ Braves || 9–7 || Boskie (5–3) || Wohlers (5–1) || Bautista (2) || 48,939 || 63–65–1 || W1
|- style="background:#fbb;"
| 130 || August 28 || @ Braves || 1–5 || Avery (15–4) || Guzmán (11–9) || – || 48,940 || 63–66–1 || L1
|- style="background:#fbb;"
| 131 || August 29 || @ Braves || 2–8 || Glavine (16–5) || Hibbard (10–11) || – || 47,361 || 63–67–1 || L2
|- style="background:#bfb;"
| 132 || August 30 || Phillies || 10–6  || Plesac (2–1) || Mason (4–11) || – || 33,276 || 64–67–1 || W1
|- style="background:#fbb;"
| 133 || August 31 || Phillies || 0–7 || Rivera (12–7) || Morgan (9–13) || – || 19,961 || 64–68–1 || L1

|-
|- style="background:#fbb;"
| 134 || September 1 || Phillies || 1–4 || Mulholland (12–9) || Harkey (8–8) || – || 23,519 || 64–69–1 || L2
|- style="background:#bfb;"
| 139 || September 6 || @ Phillies || 7–6 || Harkey (9–8) || Williams (1–1) || Myers (40) || 30,765 || 68–70–1 || W4
|- style="background:#bfb;"
| 140 || September 7 || @ Phillies || 5–4 || Guzmán (12–10) || Rivera (12–8) || Myers (41) || 27,041 || 69–70–1 || W5
|- style="background:#bfb;"
| 141 || September 8 || @ Phillies || 8–5 || Hibbard (12–11) || West (6–4) || Myers (42) || 26,553 || 70–70–1 || W6
|- style="background:#fbb;"
| 142 || September 9 || @ Phillies || 8–10 || Jackson (12–10) || Bautista (7–3) || West (3) || 25,894 || 70–71–1 || L1

|-

|- style="text-align:center;"
| Legend:       = Win       = Loss       = PostponementBold = Cubs team member

Player stats

Batting

Starters by position 
Note: Pos = Position; G = Games played; AB = At bats; H = Hits; Avg. = Batting average; HR = Home runs; RBI = Runs batted in

Other batters 
Note: G = Games played; AB = At bats; H = Hits; Avg. = Batting average; HR = Home runs; RBI = Runs batted in

Pitching

Starting pitchers 
Note: G = Games pitched; IP = Innings pitched; W = Wins; L = Losses; ERA = Earned run average; SO = Strikeouts

Other pitchers 
Note: G = Games pitched; IP = Innings pitched; W = Wins; L = Losses; ERA = Earned run average; SO = Strikeouts

Relief pitchers 
Note: G = Games pitched; W = Wins; L = Losses; SV = Saves; ERA = Earned run average; SO = Strikeouts

Farm system 

LEAGUE CHAMPIONS: Iowa

References

1993 Chicago Cubs season at Baseball Reference

Chicago Cubs seasons
Chicago Cubs season
1993 in sports in Illinois